Leonard Grieve Robinson (September 29, 1908 – after 1945) was a businessman and political figure in Ontario. He represented Waterloo South in the Legislative Assembly of Ontario from 1943 to 1945 as a Co-operative Commonwealth member. He was born in Regina, Saskatchewan, the son of John Acton Leonard Robinson and Blanche Grieve, and was educated in Napanee, Regina, Calgary, Ottawa and at Toronto University. In 1937, Robinson married Isabelle Mary Bate. He was owner of the Grieve Robinson Co. Robinson lived in Galt.

References 

1908 births
Year of death missing
Ontario Co-operative Commonwealth Federation MPPs
20th-century Canadian politicians